Alexander Remmovich Melentyev (27 June 1954 – 16 February 2015) was a Soviet competitive sport shooter who won a gold medal at the 1980 Summer Olympics. The world record he set in 1980 remained unbeaten for 34 years. He was the first Olympic gold medalist from Kyrgyzstan.

Bio

Melentyev was born in the Russian city of Penza but grew up in the Kyrgyz SSR.

At the 1980 Olympics in Moscow, Melentyev achieved a world record result of 581 (from 600, without final) in the 50 m pistol event in setting a new world and a new Olympic record. The world record was surpassed by Jin Jong-oh at the 2014 World Championships; with his score of 581 Melentyev remains the current Olympic record holder.

References

dataOlympics profile
Profile

External links

1954 births
2015 deaths
Soviet male sport shooters
Russian male sport shooters
Kyrgyzstani male sport shooters
ISSF pistol shooters
Olympic shooters of the Soviet Union
Shooters at the 1980 Summer Olympics
Shooters at the 1988 Summer Olympics
Olympic gold medalists for the Soviet Union
Olympic medalists in shooting
Shooters at the 1994 Asian Games
Sportspeople from Penza
Honoured Masters of Sport of the USSR

Medalists at the 1980 Summer Olympics
Asian Games competitors for Kyrgyzstan